Focht Hill is a low mountain in Northampton County, Pennsylvania. It is a part of the Reading Prong of the Appalachian Mountains.

References 

Mountains of Northampton County, Pennsylvania
Mountains of Pennsylvania